Hemituerta is a genus of moths of the family Noctuidae. The genus was erected by Sergius G. Kiriakoff in 1977.

Species
 Hemituerta mahdi Pagenstecher, 1903
 Hemituerta nana Hampson, 1916

References

Agaristinae